In mathematics, the q-Laguerre polynomials, or generalized Stieltjes–Wigert polynomials P(x;q) are a family of basic hypergeometric orthogonal polynomials in the basic Askey scheme introduced by .  give a detailed list of their properties.

Definition

The q-Laguerre polynomials are given in terms of basic hypergeometric functions and the q-Pochhammer symbol by

Orthogonality
Orthogonality is defined by the unimono nature of the polynomials' convergence at boundaries in integral form.

References

Orthogonal polynomials
Q-analogs
Special hypergeometric functions